Lancaster County is a county located in the U.S. state of Nebraska. As of the 2020 United States Census, the population was 322,608, making it the second-most populous county in Nebraska. Its county seat is Lincoln, the state capital. The county was created in 1859.

Lancaster County is part of the Lincoln, NE Metropolitan Statistical Area.

In the Nebraska license plate system, Lancaster County was represented by the prefix 2 (it had the second-largest number of vehicles registered in the state when the license plate system was established in 1922). In 2002, the state discontinued the 1922 system in Lancaster, Douglas and Sarpy counties.

Geography

Major highways

  Interstate 80
  Interstate 180
  U.S. Highway 6
  U.S. Highway 34
  U.S. Highway 77
  Nebraska Highway 2
  Nebraska Highway 33
  Nebraska Highway 43
  Nebraska Highway 79

Climate
In 2004, Lancaster County was named a StormReady county by the National Weather Service.

Adjacent counties

 Saunders County – north
 Cass County – northeast
 Otoe County – southeast
 Johnson County – southeast
 Gage County – south
 Saline County – southwest
 Seward County – northwest
 Butler County – northwest

Protected areas

 Bluestem Lake State Recreation Area
 Branched Oak State Recreation Area
 Conestoga Lake State Recreation Area
 Frank Shoemaker Marsh (part of Lincoln Parks & Recreation System)
 Holmes Lake Recreation Area
 Olive Creek Lake State Recreation Area
 Pawnee State Recreation Area
 Pioneers Park Nature Center
 Stagecoach Lake State Recreation Area
 Wagon Train Lake State Recreation Area
 Wildwood Lake State Wildlife Management Area
 Yankee Hill State Wildlife Management Area

Demographics

As of the 2000 United States Census, there were 250,291 people, 99,187 households, and 60,702 families in the county. The population density was 298 people per square mile (115/km2). There were 104,217 housing units at an average density of 124 per square mile (48/km2). The racial makeup of the county was 90.07% White, 2.82% Black or African American, 0.64% Native American, 2.86% Asian American, 0.06% Pacific Islander, 1.69% from other races, and 1.87% from two or more races. 3.37% of the population were Hispanic or Latino of any race. 39.1% were of German, 7.9% English and 7.8% Irish ancestry.

There were 99,187 households, out of which 30.30% had children under the age of 18 living with them, 48.80% were married couples living together, 9.10% had a female householder with no husband present, and 38.80% were non-families. 29.10% of all households were made up of individuals, and 8.30% had someone living alone who was 65 years of age or older. The average household size was 2.40 and the average family size was 3.00.

The county population contained 23.50% under the age of 18, 15.40% from 18 to 24, 30.40% from 25 to 44, 20.30% from 45 to 64, and 10.40% who were 65 years of age or older. The median age was 32 years. For every 100 females, there were 99.80 males. For every 100 females age 18 and over, there were 98.50 males.

The median income for a household in the county was $41,850, and the median income for a family was $53,676. Males had a median income of $34,720 versus $25,614 for females. The per capita income for the county was $21,265. About 5.50% of families and 9.50% of the population were below the poverty line, including 9.90% of those under age 18 and 6.10% of those age 65 or over.

Communities

Cities
 Hickman
 Lincoln (county seat)
 Waverly

Villages

 Bennet
 Davey
 Denton
 Firth
 Hallam
 Malcolm
 Panama
 Raymond
 Roca
 Sprague

Census-designated places

 Agnew
 Cheney
 Emerald
 Kramer
 Martell
 Prairie Home
 Princeton

 Walton
 Yankee Hill

Other unincorporated communities

 Arbor
 Berks
 Bethany
 College View
 Holland
 Rokeby
 Saltillo

Census divisions
Lancaster County is divided into the following census divisions, called precincts, except for the City of Lincoln.

 Buda
 Centerville
 Denton
 Elk
 Grant
 Highland
 Lancaster
 City of Lincoln
 Lincoln
 Little Salt
 Middle Creek
 Mill
 Nemaha
 North Bluff
 Oak
 Olive Branch
 Panama
 Rock Creek
 Saltillo
 South Pass
 Stevens Creek
 Stockton
 Waverly
 West Oak
 Yankee Hill

Politics
Lancaster County has historically been somewhat conservative for an urban county. In the last 30 national elections, Lancaster County selected the Republican Party candidate 78% of the time. However, it has become more competitive in recent years, largely due to the influence of Lincoln and the University of Nebraska. Since 1988, the margin in the county has been 10 points or less all but once. In 2008, Barack Obama won a narrow majority in Lancaster County, becoming the first Democrat to carry the county since 1964, and only the second since 1936. The county gave a narrow plurality to Hillary Clinton in 2016.
As of December 2020, Republicans maintain a small edge in party registration in the county.

Representatives
Roma Amundson, District 4 Commissioner, retired U.S. Brigadier General

Education
School districts include:

 Crete Public Schools
 Freeman Public Schools
 Lincoln Public Schools
 Malcolm Public Schools
 Milford Public Schools
 Norris School District 160
 Palmyra District OR-1
 Raymond Central Public Schools
 Waverly School District 145
 Wilber-Clatonia Public Schools

See also
 National Register of Historic Places listings in Lancaster County, Nebraska

Notable native
 Leon Riley (1906–1970), American minor league baseball player/manager  (born in Princeton, Nebraska).

References

External links

 Lancaster County, Nebraska
 University of Nebraska-Lincoln Extension in Lancaster County

 
Lincoln, Nebraska metropolitan area
1859 establishments in Nebraska Territory
Populated places established in 1859